The Bear is a 1938 Soviet drama film directed by Isidor Annensky.

Plot 
The landlord Helen Popova, who is going through the death of her husband, visits the owner of the neighboring estate, Grigory Smirnov, who insistently demands the repayment of Elena's husband's debt in order to improve her unfavorable financial situation, and, having been refused, calls her to a duel.

Starring 
 Olga Androvskaya as Yelena Ivanovna Popova
 Mikhail Zharov as Grigori Stepanovich Smirnov
 Ivan Pelttser as Luka, the servant (as I. Pelttser)
 Konstantin Sorokin

References

External links 

1938 films
1930s Russian-language films
Soviet black-and-white films
Soviet comedy-drama films
1938 comedy-drama films